Hospitality Suite is a 1992 stage play written by Roger Rueff that centers on conflicting notions of character, salesmanship, honesty, religion, and love that simmer until they boil over as two experienced salesmen and a young research engineer await a CEO whose visit to their modest hospitality suite could save their company from ruin.

Plot summary
In a small hotel room on the 26th floor of the Holiday Inn in downtown Wichita, Kansas, three representatives of an industrial lubricants firm prepare to host a convention hospitality suite. One is Phil, a recently divorced account manager in his mid-50s who's begun to question his purpose in life and work. Another is Larry, about 40 and energetic—the embodiment of confident salesmanship but far more than just another glad hand. The third is Bob, early 20s, a fresh recruit from the company research department—brought into the affair (and out of his element) to represent the company's technical expertise. He is fresh out of school, recently married, affable, inquisitive, and religious. Larry and Phil have a singular hope for the evening—to make the acquaintance of Dick Fuller -- CEO of one of the largest manufacturing firms in the Midwest and, as such, a potential savior of their ailing company... a man whom they invited but have never met or seen.

As the three prepare the room and themselves to host the evening's festivities, the conversation tacks into delicate issues not often discussed in a business environment—including religion, where the stark differences between Larry and Bob come to light and subtle battle lines are drawn below the surface.

Late that night, when the last of the partygoers has downed his last drink and left the room, Phil and Larry are desolate because Dick Fuller didn't show. Larry had even left the room to search for him earlier in the night but was unable to hunt him down. All seems truly lost until, by a slip of the tongue, they realize that Dick Fuller did show up and that Bob unwittingly talked to him at length about a lot of issues unrelated to industrial lubricants, including religion—a fact that accentuates the battle lines and brings Larry's blood to a low boil. Bob is sent on a mission to find Dick Fuller at another party down the street and relay Larry and Phil's desire to speak to him about lubricants.

Later still, as Phil and Larry wait for Bob, the questions bugging Phil about life and purpose make themselves known—cutting through the veneer of their relationship and exposing both to their true feelings about each other. When Bob returns and reveals that he found Dick Fuller but that he could only bring himself to talk to him about Jesus, the gloves come off, and no one is left unscathed.

Film adaptation

Director John Swanbeck created a 1999 motion picture version of the play titled The Big Kahuna. Roger Rueff wrote the screenplay with Kevin Spacey (Larry), Danny DeVito (Phil) and Peter Facinelli (Bob) starring in the title roles.

American plays adapted into films
Plays set in Kansas
1992 plays